Horodecki is a Polish language surname. It corresponds to the Russian language surname Gorodetsky. Notable people with the surname include:

Chris Horodecki (born 1987), Polish-Canadian mixed martial artist
Michał Horodecki (born 1973), Polish physicist
Paweł Horodecki (born 1971), Polish physicist
Ryszard Horodecki (born 1943), Polish physicist
Władysław Horodecki (1863—1930), Polish architect and big-game hunter

Polish-language surnames